The Lichfield transmitting station is situated close to Tamworth in Staffordshire in the West Midlands between the A5 and A51. The nearest geographical feature is Hopwas Hill. The station is owned and operated by Arqiva. The mast is known locally as Hopwas mast or Hints mast.

History

The station was the main 405-line ITV transmitter for the Midlands from 1956 to1985.

This tower was replaced by the tall mast which came into service on 18 July 1961. The 450 ft tower was dismantled in 1962 and shipped to Jersey, Channel Islands and re erected at Fremont Point on the north of the Island.
 
625-line colour transmitters for the region were all co-sited at the nearby Sutton Coldfield transmitting station until 1997, when Lichfield began broadcasting Channel 5 in the Midlands. At 1000 kW on C37 it was the most powerful Channel 5 transmitter in the country. Before the digital switchover, Lichfield effectively worked in conjunction with Sutton Coldfield (4 miles to the SW) to supply the full five analogue channels. Reception of Channel 5 from Lichfield was also receivable at viewable quality throughout the borders of North Wales.

All analogue TV transmissions ceased on 21 September 2011, as part of the digital switchover. A temporary HD multiplex BBC B (Mux HD) on C34 was moved to the Sutton Coldfield transmitting station on C40+ (626.2 MHz) thereby ceasing all analogue and digital television broadcasts from the Lichfield transmitter.

Services listed by frequency

Analogue radio (FM VHF)

Digital radio (DAB)

Analogue television

17 February 1956 – 3 January 1985

30 March 1997 – 21 September 2011
Analogue television is no longer broadcast from Lichfield. Channel 5 closed on 21 September 2011.

Digital television
Digital television is no longer broadcast from Lichfield as of 21 September 2011.

See also
List of masts
List of tallest buildings and structures in Great Britain
List of radio stations in the United Kingdom

References

External links
 The Transmission Gallery: photographs, coverage maps and information
 Bob Cotton's Lichfield Memories
 http://skyscraperpage.com/diagrams/?b61327
 Lichfield Transmitter at thebigtower.com

Transmitter sites in England
Lichfield District